Stegazopteryx ivimkaensis is a species of beetle in the family Carabidae, the only species in the genus Stegazopteryx.

References

Pterostichinae